Avé de Fátima (English: Fátima Ave), also known as the Fátima Hymn, is a popular Roman Catholic Marian hymn. It is sung in honour of Our Lady of Fátima, a Catholic title of the Blessed Virgin Mary based on the Marian apparitions reported in 1917 by three shepherd children at Cova da Iria, in Fátima, Portugal.

The hymn was written in August 1929 by Portuguese poet Afonso Lopes Vieira and it was first published, anonymously ("by a Servite"), in the 13 September 1929 issue of the religious periodical Voz da Fátima. Lopes Vieira had witnessed what he later identified as the Miracle of the Sun on 13 October 1917 from the balcony of his house in São Pedro de Moel (about 50 kilometers from Fátima), alongside his wife and mother-in-law. The month he wrote the hymn, August, 1929, coincides with the conclusion of a small chapel dedicated to Our Lady of Fátima that Lopes Vieira had built in the house. The original version of the Avé de Fátima, sent to José Alves Correia da Silva, Bishop of Leiria, was set to a tune by Francisco de Lacerda.

Versions
There are several versions of the hymn in use in different parts of the world; the adaptations in different languages are set to the same tune, theme, and refrain. What follows are two English-language versions:

References

Marian devotions
Marian hymns
Our Lady of Fátima